Foolish may refer to:
 the derived term Foolishness
 "Foolish" (Ashanti song), 2002
 "Foolish" (Shawty Lo song), 2008
 "Foolish" (Tyler James song), 2004
 Foolish (album), a 1994 album by Superchunk
 Foolish (film), a 1999 film
 Foolish (soundtrack), soundtrack to the 1999 film
 Foolish Lake, a lake in California

See also 
 Fool (disambiguation)
 Folly (disambiguation)
 FoolishPeople, a British theatre and production collective